Soledad "La Sole" Pastorutti (born October 12, 1980, in Arequito, Santa Fe) is an Argentine folk singer, who brought the genre to the younger generations at the end of the 20th century, and the beginning of the 21st.

She is also a film and TV actress. Soledad is the older sister of Argentine singer Natalia Pastorutti.

Her first album, Poncho al Viento, is Sony Music's best-selling album ever in Argentina according to Alberto Caldero, Sony Music's president in the late 90s, in an interview with La Nación newspaper.

Career
In 1995, when Pastorutti was only 15 years old, César Isella took her under his tutelage to participate in the Cosquín folklore festival. Her performance with her sister Natalia landed her a contract with Sony Music Argentina to record and release her first album, Poncho al Viento, that very same year. After one year singing in over 181 villages and cities in Argentina, Soledad was already popular in the whole country. By the time her second album was released, her first album became a huge hit in Argentina. She was so incredibly successful and popular that the media called her 'Huracan de Arequito' (Arequito's Hurricane).

In 1997 she recorded her second album, La Sole, which she also presented in several concerts throughout the country, including 10 concerts in Buenos Aires' Teatro Gran Rex. During the year, both of her albums went to No. 1 several times.

In 1998 her success kept growing. She performed more concerts at the Teatro Gran Rex, and accompanied the Argentina national football team for the 1998 FIFA World Cup. In Madrid, Spain, she received a distinction from Sony International for selling a million units of her first two works.

Upon her return, Sony Music Argentina recognised her as the best seller artist of the company in all the musical genres, and edited her third album A mi gente, recorded live during her concerts. For the first time, folkloric music was getting huge airplay in radios and discos.

In 1999 she became the protagonist of the movie Edad del Sol (anagram of her name), and recorded her fourth album Yo sí Quiero a mi país this time in studios in Miami under the production of Cuban Emilio Estefan. That album opened doors to other markets in, among others, Bolivia, Uruguay, Paraguay, Chile, Peru, Mexico, United States and Spain in which she would also have concerts.

Edad del Sol was a huge production for Argentina's cinema standard and Clarin reported Soledad asked for three times more than an A-list Argentine actor asks for a movie. The movie, about a graduation trip, was shot in Bariloche. The movie was not as successful as expected and Manuelita, a cartoon based on a popular children song, stole the spotlight and was the most successful national movie in 20 years. The movie also was not well received by critics.

In 2000 she returned, after 2 years, to Buenos Aires for 3 concerts at the Luna Park. In August she participated in the Martigues Folklore Festival where she was widely praised. Back in Argentina she started recording her fifth album, released in October of that year. Before the release, La Sole performed at the Barbican Centre of London during a festival of Argentine cinema and music. She also participated of the 2000 Viña del Mar International Song Festival in Chile, considered the most important recurring music festival in Latin America, where she received the Audience prize.

Her sixth album was recorded in 2001, produced by Alejandro Lerner and Fernando Isella, with a renovated style. She had again concerts at the Gran Rex, and received the "Silver Torch" award at the Viña del Mar Festival. Soledad debuted on TV in the telenovela (soap opera) Rincón de Luz in 2003.

She was also chosen as one of the coaches for the Argentine version of the reality singing competition The Voice, and in recent years, she served as a judge on Telefe version of the singing competition program Rising Star. Since 2008, she has hosted the best known music program Ecos de Mi Tierra.

Soledad has done over 2000 shows, many outside of Argentina some of great relevance, including: at the Martigues Folklore Festival (France) where she was widely praised, at the Barbican Centre of London during a festival of Argentine cinema and music, and at the Viña del Mar International Song Festival in Chile, considered the most important recurring music festival in Latin America, where she received the Audience Prize, and also received the Silver Torch award.

She has released 16 albums, including studio and live recordings, and has been nominated for several Latin Grammy Awards. She has recorded duets and features with international artists, including Alejandro Sanz, Carlos Vives, Santana, Niña Pastori, Lila Downs, Joan Manuel Serrat, Franco de Vita, and Juanes.

In July 2013, she performed for Pope Francis at World Youth Day, closing the event in Rio de Janeiro, by singing in front of more three million people.

In 2014, Soledad released Raíz, a collaborative album featuring Mexican singer Lila Downs and Spanish artist Niña Pastori, and received a nomination for a Grammy Award for Best Latin Pop Album and the Latin Grammy Award for Album of the Year, winning the Latin Grammy for Best Folk Album. The trio also collaborated with Santana on the track Una Noche en Nápoles for the 2014 album Corazón.

In 2015, Soledad released a new album, Vivir es hoy. Her first single, "Dame una sonrisa," featured Carlos Vives. Soledad started a new tour in several cities across Argentina, Chile, and Uruguay, including three sold-out shows in the Teatro Opera in Buenos Aires.

In 2016, Soledad celebrated her 20-year career with a show at the mythical Cosquin Festival, where many of the most important artists from Argentina joined her on stage for an unprecedented event.

In April, she was the only Argentine artist invited to the Billboard Latin Conference & Awards, as a part of the Divas panel, and later, to give a show at the Fillmore Miami Beach at the Jackie Gleason. She returned to Santiago, Chile just in time to sell out shows at the Teatro Nescafe and the Dreams in Viña del Mar. In June, her career reached a new milestone when she was contracted by the American cable network ABC to sing "Don't Cry for Me Argentina" in one of their most popular reality shows, "The Bachelorette"

When she returned to Argentina, Soledad released a CD/DVD set, "20 años" (20 years), which coincided with the beginning of a tour of Argentina and internationally, complete with an enormous stage show that sold out Luna Park and other major cities in Argentina, and had great success at 30 shows in 7 countries (Uruguay, Chile, Bolivia, Ecuador, US, Canada and Spain).

Personal life
After seven years with her boyfriend Jeremías Audoglio, they married on April 28 in Arequito.  On June 10, 2010, she and Jeremias had a daughter, Antonia Audoglio Pastorutti, in Rosario, Santa Fe (Argentina).  They had a second daughter, Regina, on February 19, 2013.

Discography
1994 – Pilchas gauchas
1996 – Poncho al viento
1997 – La Sole
1998 – A mi gente (Live)
1999 – Yo sí quiero a mi país
2000 – Mis grandes canciones
2000 – Soledad
2001 – Libre
2002 – Juntos por única vez (Live with Horacio Guarany)
2003 – Adonde vayas
2005 – Diez años de Soledad
2008 – Folklore
2009 – La Fiesta: Juntos de verdad (Live)
2010 – Vivo en Arequito
2014 – Raíz (with Niña Pastori and Lila Downs)
2015 – Vivir es hoy
2016 – 20 años
2020 - Parte de mí

References

External links

laSole.net
Soledad YouTube official channel

1980 births
Living people
20th-century Argentine women singers
Argentine people of Italian descent
People from Caseros Department
21st-century Argentine women singers
Women in Latin music